A Villa in Los Angeles  (Une villa à Los Angeles) is a French Comedy drama. It is the first feature film written and directed by Aliocha.

Plot
A father, his son and some friends spend a weekend by the sea, but relationships worsen and tensions rise to the rhythm of the ever-changing tides.

Cast
 Jean-Louis Coulloc'h as Jean-Louis
 Vincent Guédon as Vincent
 Pascal Leduc as Pascal
 Valère Leduc as Valère
 Pablo Saavedra as Pablo
 Susan Jane Aufray as Sue, Jean-Louis' friend

External links

French comedy-drama films
2010s French-language films
Films directed by Aliocha
2013 films
2010s French films